Michael Katz is an Israeli chef and food writer. He is a former teacher at the Le Cordon Bleu institute and has opened his own restaurant in Israel. Before leaving in the fall of 2021, Katz was the head teacher of the professional gourmet chefs course at the Art Dan Gourmet culinary school based in Tel Aviv. 

Today, he has opened a new culinary school in Israel called Attilio, named after his first chef and mentor, Attilio Basso. 

It is the first culinary institution in Israel to offer vegan and gluten free courses in its curriculum, created in collaboration with Vegan Friendly.

The aim of the school is to provide with a professional and comprehensive education that is held to the same standard as the top schools around the world.

Biography
Katz was born and raised in Jerusalem, the son of Joseph Katz, a professor of theoretical physics at the Rakeach Institute of the Hebrew University of Jerusalem, and Ruth Yardeni-Katz, a writer and educator.
Following his military service, he traveled to study cooking in Brussels. For a period of five years, he studied and worked in restaurants that were rated with either two or three Michelen stars, including "L'Ecailler du Palais Royal", “La Villa Laorraine”, “Chez Bruno”, and “La Bergerie”.

Career
Katz returned to Israel after working abroad, where he opened his own restaurant "Michael Andrew" in Jerusalem, together with the restaurateur Andrew Jacobs from London (one of the founders of the chain restaurant “Giraffe” which is centered in London). The restaurant was closed in 2001 as a result of the second Intifada. Katz moved to London, where for two years, he served as the head chef of “Ruddland Stubbes” and “The Brasserie”.

In 2004, Katz began teaching at the London branch of the cooking school “Le Cordon Bleu” where he taught as a full-time teacher for three years. At the time, he was the only chef from Israel to have taught there.

After living in Mexico for 3 years, he returned to Israel in 2009 and was appointed executive head chef of the Adom restaurant group.

From October 2013, he has served as the head chef of the Trattoria Haba restaurant, whose concept he personally developed with the Jerusalem-based Haba family. Until October 2021, Katz was the director of a course aimed at professional chefs at the Dan Gourmet Culinary Studies. He left to proceed other endeavors. 

This included opening Attilio, a culinary school in the high tech area of Or Yehuda in Israel.

Writing
Haaretz newspaper has a column on food that Katz writes for, discussing the breakthrough technologies in the food world.

References

Living people
Israeli chefs
Year of birth missing (living people)